Three Times About Love is a 1981 Soviet drama film directed by Viktor Tregubovich.

Plot 
The film tells about the collective farm driver Vasily Lobanov, who, having returned from the army, finds out that his beloved girl got married and he decides to choose a more suitable bride.

Cast 
 Sergei Prokhanov as Vasiliy Fedorovich Lobanov
 Marina Tregubovich as Verka
 Marina Levtova as Elena Ivanovna
 Nadezhda Shumilova as Nyurka
 Valentina Kovel as Anna Makarovna Lobanova
 Aleksey Mironov as Fedor Lobanov
 Ivan Agafonov as Anisimych
 Yelena Obleukhova as Tonya
 Aleksey Zharkov as Pashka
 Lyudmila Ksenofontova as Klava (as L. Ksenofontova)

References

External links 
 

1981 films
1980s Russian-language films
Soviet drama films
1981 drama films